Aadesh - The Power of Law is a 2017 Indian Marathi film directed by Suvahhdan Angre and produced by Yogesh Wanve, based on the life of public prosecutor Ujjwal Nikam. A courtroom drama, it is the first Indian film about a prosecuting attorney.

Reception
Aadesh - The Power of Law received strongly negative reviews. Mayuri Phandis of the Times of India rated it one out of five stars, referring to it as a "dramatised and poorly shot string of cases" that "does nothing to satiate the curiosities" of the viewer.

Cast
 Suvahhdan Angre
 Anant Jog
 Mukesh Tiwari
 Ashok Shinde
 Mithila Naik
 Yogesh Wanve

Soundtrack

References

Indian courtroom films
2010s Marathi-language films